Darling County is one of the 141 Cadastral divisions of New South Wales. It includes Manilla and Barraba

Darling County was probably named after the seventh Governor of New South Wales Sir Ralph Darling (1775-1858).

Parishes 
A full list of parishes found within this county; their current LGA and mapping coordinates to the approximate centre of each location is as follows:

References

Counties of New South Wales